Thomas William Rodway (6 January 1879–1959) was an English footballer who played in the Football League for Preston North End.

References

1879 births
1959 deaths
English footballers
Association football defenders
English Football League players
Preston North End F.C. players
Chorley F.C. players
Fleetwood Town F.C. players